Ronald Arthur LaPointe (born February 28, 1957 in Framingham, Massachusetts) is a former professional American football player. He played tight end in the National Football League for two seasons; one each with the Baltimore Colts and the Oakland Raiders. He played collegiately at Penn State University.

LaPointe was a multi-sport athlete at Holliston High School, in Holliston, Massachusetts, where he played American football, basketball, and baseball. In an era with few restrictions on player contact from college recruiters, LaPointe was reportedly pursued by more than 50 colleges, including such football powerhouses as Tennessee, Ohio State, Penn State, Boston College, Oklahoma State, and Syracuse.

Penn State
LaPointe was redshirted his freshman year (1975) and played sparingly behind future All-Pro, Mickey Shuler the next two seasons (1976, 1977). He would become the starter in 1979, catching 5 passes for 90 yards and 1 touchdown.

He earned a Bachelor of Science in physical education from Penn State in 1979.

NFL
LaPointe had planned on becoming a teacher upon graduation, but was signed by the Baltimore Colts as a free agent following the 1980 NFL Draft. Projected to be a starter that season, he was hampered all season by a hip pointer and torn rib cartilage and was released by Baltimore at the end of the season. He signed with the Oakland Raiders the following season, but suffered a career-ending injury in training camp. He signed an injury waiver and was released from the team.

Personal
LaPointe returned to Penn State for graduate school. He began a second career in finance, and has worked for Kidder, Peabody & Co., Merrill Lynch, and Prudential Financial. LaPointe, his wife, Andrea, and their sons Luc and Will now live in Atlantic County, New Jersey where he is an assistant administrator in training at  SeaShore Gardens Living Center.

References

1957 births
Living people
Sportspeople from Framingham, Massachusetts
American football tight ends
Baltimore Colts players
Oakland Raiders players
Penn State Nittany Lions football players
People from Holliston, Massachusetts
Players of American football from Massachusetts